Marie-Sadio Beatrice Rosche (born August 10, 1987) is a Senegalese basketball player. She represented Senegal in the basketball competition at the 2016 Summer Olympics.

References

Senegalese women's basketball players
Basketball players at the 2016 Summer Olympics
Olympic basketball players of Senegal
1987 births
Living people
Senegalese expatriate basketball people in France
Centers (basketball)